"Joys of Christmas" is a song by British singer-songwriter Chris Rea, which was released in 1987 as the third single from his ninth studio album Dancing with Strangers. The song was written and produced by Rea. "Joys of Christmas" reached No. 67 in the UK Singles Chart and remained in the Top 100 for two weeks.

Background
"Joys of Christmas" was inspired by Rea's own experiences of growing up as a child in Middlesbrough. Rea recalled for the liner notes of the 2019 re-issue of Dancing with Strangers, 

The single's B-side is the first version of "Driving Home for Christmas" that Rea recorded. The song was re-recorded for New Light Through Old Windows in 1988 and released as a single in its own right.

Critical reception
On its release as a single, Danny Baker of New Musical Express questioned "Joys of Christmas" as an A-side and felt that the "wee low-key gift tucked away on the B-side", "Driving Home for Christmas", was "the real winner". He added, "'Joys of Christmas' isn't even a seasonally recorded deal. It says here that it's from his last LP. How very odd." In a review of Dancing with Strangers, Robin Denselow of The Guardian described "Joys of Christmas" as a "bleak view of life in the North" and noted the song's "melodic bluesy feel" and "spoken pieces". Helen Metella of the Edmonton Journal commented that the song "juxtaposes a modern hymn against the snapshots of out-of-work youth in north England". James Muretich of the Calgary Herald felt Rea had "penned a classic" with "Joys of Christmas" and noted its "cutting, Claptonish guitar licks" and "tales of hardship amid the season of supposed joy".

Track listing
7-inch single
 "Joys of Christmas" – 5:04
 "Driving Home for Christmas" – 4:34

12-inch single
 "Joys of Christmas" – 5:04
 "Driving Home for Christmas" – 4:34
 "Hello Friend" (re-record) – 4:20

CD single
 "Joys of Christmas" – 5:04
 "Yes I Do" – 3:21
 "Driving Home for Christmas" – 4:34
 "Hello Friend" (re-record) – 4:20

Personnel
Credits are adapted from the UK CD single liner notes and the Dancing with Strangers booklet.

Joys of Christmas
 Chris Rea - guitar, accordion, brass, harmonica, vocals
 Eoghan O'Neill - bass
 Martin Ditcham - drums, percussion

Production
 Chris Rea - producer (all tracks), mixing on "Joys of Christmas" and "Yes I Do"
 Jon Kelly - mixing on "Joys of Christmas" and "Yes I Do"
 Stuart Eales - producer on "Driving Home for Christmas" and "Hello Friend", engineer on "Joys of Christmas"

Other
 Anne Magill - illustration
 The Leisure Process - design

Charts

References

1987 songs
1987 singles
Chris Rea songs
Magnet Records singles
Songs written by Chris Rea